Ninja Turf (also known as Los Angeles Streetfighter and L.A. Streetfighters) is a 1985 martial arts film, starring Jun Chong and Phillip Rhee. Loren Avedon, Thomas F. Wilson in his feature film debut, and Peter Malota appear in this film in small roles.

Plot
Tony is the new kid at school. Right off the bat, he befriends gang leader Young and his friends Mark, Frank, and Darrin. However, after bumping into Young's rival Chan, he gets threatened. Young challenges Chan to a fight and defeats him using a wooden sword to Chan's staff. Two mysterious people show up and offer Young and his friends a job for a private security agency. When the boys aren't in school, they pull security at a party. They get into fights with the Spikes Gang, a racist gang and the Blades, a Latino gang. Meanwhile, Tony starts a romance with Lily, who just happens to be Chan's sister and that just makes Chan even more upset and at the same time, Young seems jealous that Tony has found love where Young feels alone due to his mother's constant drinking and promiscuity. He sees Tony as a brother and when he sees him with Lily, it makes his upset.

When the boys are asked to do security for a rich businessman, Young learns that his new client is actually one of the biggest drug dealers in the city. After the party, while the dealer is with his girlfriend, Young takes the briefcase of money the mob boss scored on the deal and runs off. Angry, the mob boss hires two hitmen, a master Yakuza swordsman named Yoshida and a New York-based martial artist named Kruger. The hitmen confront Chan and his men, yet Chan decides to help them locate their hideout. Mark, Frank, and Darrin are all kidnapped and tortured. While Tony is at home studying, Young proceeds to take out the syndicate. He kills Yoshida but is slightly injured in the process. He defeats Kruger by breaking his knee.

On his way back with the very injured Mark, Frank, and Darrin, Young is confronted by Chan and his gang. Finally realizing her mistakes, Young's mother tells Young she is sorry and that she loves him. However, Chan proceeds to hit Young's mom and Young is mortally wounded in a fight. Tony, looking for Young, finds his fallen friend and goes on a rampage. Taking Young's wooden sword, he proceeds to defeat Chan's gang and mortally wound Chan himself with a strike to the head with the sword. As Young's mom and Tony run towards Young, Young passes away in their arms and the two grieve as daylight hits Los Angeles.

Cast
Jun Chong as Young
Phillip Rhee as Tony
James Lew as Chan
Rosanna King as Lily
Bill Wallace as Kruger
Ken Nagayama as Yoshida
Mark Hicks as Mark
Frank Marmolejo as Frank
Darrin Mukama as Darrin
Loren Avedon as Chan's Gang Member
Danny Gibson as Spikes Gang Leader
John Rojas as Blades Leader
Toma Gjokaj as Drug Dealer
Peter Malota as Syndicate Gang Member
Thomas F. Wilson as Spikes Gang Member

Reception
The movie gained mixed reviews.

References

External links
 

1986 films
Films about Korean Americans
1986 martial arts films
American martial arts films
Ninja films
1980s English-language films
1980s American films